Mein gon (面干 miàn-gān), informally referred to as crunchy noodles or crunchy chow mein, are a type of noodle-shaped cracker (or dried biscuit) used in American Chinese cuisine.

American Chinese cuisine
In American Chinese cuisine, the mein gon pieces are generally sprinkled into chicken chow mein, and then served together. Despite the informal English name referring to it as a noodle, it is not actually classified as a form of Chinese noodle.

It can also be crumbled and sprinkled onto American Chinese salad dishes, such as Chinese chicken salad, in a manner similar to croutons. Crunchy fried chow mein noodles are often served with duck sauce and Chinese hot mustard as an appetizer in American Chinese restaurants.

See also
 Chinese noodle
 La Choy

American Chinese cuisine
Cantonese words and phrases
Crackers (food)